Carolina Cyclone is an Arrow Dynamics roller coaster located at Carowinds in Charlotte, North Carolina. The coaster is located in the Carolina Boardwalk area of the park. Built in 1980 by world-renowned (and now defunct) coaster manufacturer Arrow Dynamics, it was the first roller coaster to have four inversions, two loops and two corkscrews.

History
On June 21, 1979, Carowinds announced that they would be building a new roller coaster for the 1980 season. It would be called Carolina Cyclone and be the first roller coaster to have four inversions. Carolina Cyclone officially opened to the public on March 22, 1980.

The ride was originally painted with red-orange track and black supports, and later bluish-green track with black supports, and later with blue track and dark gray supports. For the 2010 season, a new paint job was applied. The supports are light blue along the entire ride. The track in the final brake run, station, and from the station to the top of the first drop, is also painted light blue, but the inversions are painted yellow and the track on the first drop, turn between the corkscrews, and final helix are all painted orange.
In late 2021, the ride received yet another repaint. Multiple colors were put on the track to see how they would look. The supports are white and the entire track is turquoise blue.

After the 2019 season, Carolina Cyclone received new trains from another Arrow Dynamics looping coaster, the defunct Vortex at Kings Island.

Ride experience
The train exits the station, makes a sharp left turn and ascends a  lift hill. A small pre-drop and turn follows, which leads into the track's  drop. This is followed by two  vertical loops and a small hill with a banked turn. As the train makes its way over the walkway, it flips riders twice in a double corkscrew. The finale is a helix that winds low to the ground and raises back up into the brake run before returning to the station.

References

External links

Carowinds' Official Page For Carolina Cyclone

Roller coasters in North Carolina
Roller coasters operated by Cedar Fair
Roller coasters introduced in 1980
Carowinds